Carstairs Junction is a village in South Lanarkshire. Taking its name from the village of Carstairs and nearby railway junction, the village grew around the railway station which opened in 1848. In 2011 it had a population of 747.

The village has a primary school, Carstairs Junction Primary School. A church, Pettinain Church, is Category B listed.

References

Villages in South Lanarkshire
Carstairs